Texoma Medical Center was founded in 1965 in Denison, Texas. A previous location closed and the new facility opened in 2009. 
It is located an hour away from Dallas, and roughly 25–30 minutes from Durant, Oklahoma. It is called Texoma Medical Center due to its distance to the Texas/Oklahoma border, as it serves parts of North Texas and South Central Oklahoma.

References

External links 

1965 establishments in Texas
Buildings and structures in Grayson County, Texas
Hospitals established in 1965
Hospitals in Texas